Chen Tien or Chen Tian ( – 1990) was the head of the Central Propaganda Department of the Communist Party of Malaya (CPM).

Political career 
Chen was present during the Baling Talks, along with the CPM's secretary-general Chin Peng and senior leader Rashid Maidin, to discuss the resolution of the Malayan Emergency. On the other side were three elected national representatives; Tunku Abdul Rahman, Tan Cheng Lock and David Marshall. The talks took place in the Government English School at Baling on 28 December 1956. However, the talks were unsuccessful because the surrender terms were not acceptable to the Malayan Communist Party and because of disagreement over the legalising of CPM as a political party in Malaya. A few weeks after the Baling talks, Tan Siew Sin, the president of the Malayan Chinese Association (MCA) received a letter from Chen Tien, requesting a resumption of peace talks and the repeal of the emergency regulations, which he rejected. In 1960, when the emergency was officially declared at an end, Chen Tien, Chin Peng and other communists continued their rebellion.

Later life 
After the talks, Chen Tien then left the party while Chin Peng remained. He moved to China and spent his later life in the country where he married Lee Meng in 1965, the female notorious leader of the CPM who had been banished a year before. Chen died due to lung cancer on 3 September 1990.

References 

Year of birth missing
1990 deaths
Malaysian communists
Malaysian people of Chinese descent
Malaysian politicians
Malaysian independence activists